The First Federal Electoral District of Chiapas (I Distrito Electoral Federal de Chiapas) is one of the 300 Electoral Districts into which Mexico is divided for the purpose of elections to the federal Chamber of Deputies and one of 12 such districts in the state of Chiapas.

It elects one deputy to the lower house of Congress for each three-year legislative period, by means of the first past the post system.

District territory
Under the 2005 districting scheme, the First  District of Chiapas covers the municipalities of northeastern Chiapas: Catazajá, Chilón, La Libertad, Palenque, Sabanilla, Salto de Agua, Tila, Tumbalá and Yajalón.

The district's head town (cabecera distrital), where results from individual polling stations are gathered together and collated, is the city of Palenque.

Previous districting schemes

1996–2005 district
Between 1996 and 2005, the district had exactly the same composition as it currently has.

Deputies returned to Congress from this district

L Legislature
 1976–1979: Jaime Sabines (PRI)
LI Legislature
 1979–1982: Rafael Pascacio Gamboa (PRI)
LII Legislature
 1982–1985: Enoch Cansino Casahonda (PRI)
LIII Legislature
 1985–1988:
LIV Legislature
 1988–1991: Antonio Pariente Algarín (PRI)
LV Legislature
 1991–1994:
LVI Legislature
 1994–1997: Walter Antonio León Montoya (PRI)
LVII Legislature
 1997–2000: Arquímides León Ovando (PRI)
LVIII Legislature
 2000–2003: Jesús Alejandro Cruz Gutiérrez (PRI)
LIX Legislature
 2003–2006: Jorge Utrilla Robles (PRI)
LX Legislature
 2006–2009: Yari del Carmen Gebhardt Garduza (PRI)
LXIV Legislature
 2018–2021: Manuela Obrador Narváez (MORENA)
LXV Legislature
 2021–2024: Manuela Obrador Narváez (MORENA)

References 

Federal electoral districts of Mexico
Government of Chiapas